The Phaudidae are a family of insects in the order Lepidoptera.

Genera
Alophogaster
Phauda
Phaudopsis

References

Zygaenoidea
Moth families